Steven Kane is an American television and theater writer, producer and director.

Personal life
Kane was born in Cherry Hill, New Jersey and graduated from Cherry Hill High School West.  He majored in English and French at the University of Pennsylvania before attending graduate film school at the University of Southern California. His USC Master's Thesis, the short film "Heroic Symphony", garnered awards at film festivals around the country.

Career
Kane got his start in the entertainment industry writing and directing independent film and theater. His first feature film, The Doghouse, won Best Director at the NY Indy Film Festival. His collection of One Act plays, Out of Your Mind, had a successful run in Los Angeles at the GuerriLA Theater.

His television credits as a writer and producer include The Closer (for which he received an Edgar nomination), Major Crimes, Alias, NCIS, and Without a Trace, as well as comedies American Dad! and Curb Your Enthusiasm. He served as co-creator and executive producer of TNT’s The Last Ship, a post-apocalyptic drama based on William Brinkley’s novel of the same name, which had its series finale in November 2018.

In 2016, Kane was given the Distinguished Public Service Award, the United States Navy's top civilian honor, for The Last Ship.

In March 2019, it was announced that Kane joined the Paramount+ series Halo as Showrunner. Steven wrote or co-wrote every episode of the first season of Halo while running the show on the ground in Hungary. Production was halted for six months in 2020 due to the COVID-19 pandemic, but completed in the summer of 2021.

While completing post-production on Season 1 of Halo, Kane joined Amazon Prime Video series Jack Ryan as showrunner for Season 4.

References

External links
 

1968 births
Living people
People from Cherry Hill, New Jersey
Cherry Hill High School West alumni
Screenwriters from New Jersey
University of Pennsylvania alumni
University of Southern California alumni
21st-century American screenwriters
American male screenwriters